Pobre señorita Limantour (English title: Poor Miss Limantour) is a Mexican telenovela broadcast on El Canal de las Estrellas in 1987. Was starring Víctor Cámara in his debut in Mexican telenovelas, Ofelia Cano in her only starring in soap operas and Manuel Saval and Úrsula Prats in antagonistics. It also marked the debut of Thalía in Mexican telenovelas. It is based on the soap opera "Regina Carbonell" Inés Rodena original.

Plot 
Regina Limantour is an honest young woman who lives with her aunt and her sister Doris. Bernarda is a cruel woman having fun humiliating and mocking Regina, calling her "Poor Miss Limantour". On the death of Bernarda, Regina is animated by Pilar a woman who has taken a liking to the girl, to get better and become what she craves, a nurse. Regina listens to her advice and finally manages to get her career going. Regina starts working in a hospital where she meets a future doctor: Julio Adrián Montesinos, a rich young man who falls in love despite the warnings of her coworkers, and Julio Adrian has a reputation for womanizing and irresponsible.

However, their love will face many hurdles, the biggest of which is named Greta Torreblanca, an unscrupulous woman who becomes obsessed with Julio Adrián and will do anything just to separate it from Regina. In this love triangle Armando, a young doctor who falls for Regina and honestly struggles to win her love, because she believes that Julio Adrián does not deserve that, true to its bad reputation, like to make fun of women adds.

Same story in the same dramatic intensity, which are protagonists Doris's sister Regina, and a wealthy man Augusto Soledad married father of two children, Dina and Pepito develop. Doris is a young, ambitious, manipulative and as cruel as was his aunt Bernarda becomes Augusto lover who constantly demands money and gifts to tell you to leave your family and marry her. Infidelity causes family break Augusto, Augusto and Soledad are no longer spoken, and Dina, a whimsical young girl blindly idolizes his father and despises the efforts of his mother to try to keep her family together.

Finally, catastrophe will befall the family when her father discovers that Dina keeps an affair with his half-sister! Because Soledad had an affair in the past which was born Doris. When the secret comes to light, the impact is so great that it causes his father seriously ill and unleash a terrible tragedy.

Cast 
 Ofelia Cano as Regina Limantour
 Víctor Cámara as Julio Adrián Montesinos
 Úrsula Prats as Greta Torreblanca Halcon
 Thalía as Dina
 Roberto Ballesteros as Germán Limantour
 Alicia Rodríguez as Soledad
 Silvia Derbez as Pastora
 Aurora Molina as Pilar
 Patsy as Doris
 Ana Luisa Peluffo as Mariana Halcon Vda. De Torreblanca
 Manuel Saval as Armando Perea
 Beatriz Sheridan as Bernarda
 Julieta Egurrola as Antonieta Altamar Barragán Vda. del Castillo/Flora Altamar Barragán
 Fabiola Elenka Tapia as Clarita
 Juan Peláez as Augusto
 Rafael Rojas as Alfonso
 Nerina Ferrer as Sor Angelina
 Christopher Lago as Pepito
 Raúl Meraz as Raymundo
 Rebeca Mankita as Caty
 Marcela Páez as Luz María
 Fernanda Ruizos as Valeria Limantour
 Queta Lavat

Awards

References 

1987 telenovelas
Mexican telenovelas
Televisa telenovelas
1987 Mexican television series debuts
1987 Mexican television series endings
Spanish-language telenovelas
Television shows set in Mexico